The following is a list of individual player awards and accomplishments for the Houston Texans franchise of the National Football League.

League-wide awards

Associated Press Defensive Player of the Year Award recipients
The following is a list of all Houston Texans players who have been named the National Football League defensive player of the year by the Associated Press.

All-Pro selections
The following is a list of all Houston Texans players named to the Associated Press All-Pro first or second teams.

Associated Press Rookie of the Year Award recipients
The following is a list of all Houston Texans players who have been named either the National Football League offensive or defensive rookie of the year by the Associated Press.

Pro Bowl selections

The following is a list of all Houston Texans players selected to the Pro Bowl.

Pro Bowl MVP Award selections
The following Houston Texans players have been named the most valuable player of the Pro Bowl.

Pepsi NFL Rookie of the Year Award recipients
The following is a list of all Houston Texans players who have been named the Pepsi NFL rookie of the year.

Team awards

Houston Texans MVP recipients
The following is a list of Houston Texans players who have been named the most valuable player of the team as determined by a vote of Texans players at the conclusion of each season.

Houston Texans Rookie of the Year recipients
The following is a list of Houston Texans players who have been named rookie of the year as determined by a vote of Texans players at the conclusion of each season.

Spirit of the Bull Award recipients
The following is a list of Houston Texans players who have been named by the team as the recipient of the Spirit of the Bull Award. This is an annual award given by the team to the Texans player who best exemplifies a commitment to excellence both on and off the field, as well as their charitable work in the Houston community.

Mark Bruener Award recipients
The following is a list of Houston Texans players who have been named by the team as the recipient of the Mark Bruener Award. This is an annual award given by the team to the Texans player who exemplifies outstanding leadership, sportsmanship, work ethic and commitment to his teammates. Until 2008, this award was known as the Spirit of the Bull Award. In 2009 the award was renamed to honor Bruener, who had won the award for four straight years from 2005-2008.

Ed Block Courage Award recipients
The following is a list of Houston Texans players who have been the team recipient of the Ed Block Courage Award. Every year, each of the 32 teams in the National Football League vote for one member of their team who, in the eyes of his teammates, is a source of inspiration and courage.

External links
 Texans 2013 Media Guide

awards and honors
Houston Texans